Anatoma euglypta is a species of very small sea snail, a marine gastropod mollusk or micromollusk in the family Anatomidae.

Description
The shell grows to a length of 11 mm.

Distribution
This marine species occurs in Antarctic and Subantarctic waters.

References

 Pelseneer, P. (1903). Zoologie: Mollusques (Amphineures, Gastropodes et Lamellibranches). Résultats du Voyage du S.Y. Belgica en 1897-1898-1899 sous le commandement de A. de Gerlache de Gomery: Rapports Scientifiques (1901–1913). Buschmann: Anvers. 85, IX plates pp
 Zelaya D.G. & Geiger D.L. (2007). Species of Scissurellidae and Anatomidae from Sub-Antarctic and Antarctic waters (Gastropopda: Vetigastropoda). Malacologia 49(2):393–443.
 Geiger D.L. (2012) Monograph of the little slit shells. Volume 1. Introduction, Scissurellidae. pp. 1–728. Volume 2. Anatomidae, Larocheidae, Depressizonidae, Sutilizonidae, Temnocinclidae. pp. 729–1291. Santa Barbara Museum of Natural History Monographs Number 7. 
 Engl W. (2012) Shells of Antarctica. Hackenheim: Conchbooks. 402 pp

External links

Anatomidae
Gastropods described in 1903